The Liberation of Belgium from German occupation was completed on 4 February 1945 when the entire country was reportedly free of German troops with the liberation of the village of Krewinkel. The operation began when Allied forces entered on 2 September 1944. The liberation came after four years of German-occupied rule. The Belgian government was returned to power on 8 September 1944, after Allied forces captured Brussels four days earlier.

Operation begins
The liberation began with 21st Army Group heading Eastwards from the breakout from Falaise - the 2nd Canadian Division entered Belgium on 2 September .

On the evening of 2 September Brian Horrocks briefed officers of the Guards Armoured Division in Douai that their objective for the following day would be Brussels, 110km further East. The announcement was greeted with "delighted astonishment". The Division suffered casualties on their drive into Belgium but with the Germans still in disarray after their defeat at Falaise, the Household Cavalry on the British left and the Grenadier Guards on the right led the way with the Welsh and Irish Guards following close behind.

Citizens of the Belgian capital had not expected to be liberated that soon and huge crowds greeted and slowed the liberators.

The Welsh Guards landed and joined the fight on 4 September with minimal resistance. The British Second Army captured Antwerp, the port city on the river Scheldt in northern Belgium, close to the Netherlands, on 4 September as well. In the following days and weeks, the Battle of the Scheldt claimed many lives, as the port of Antwerp could not be operated effectively without control of the Scheldt estuary. Antwerp was the first port to be captured by the Allies in near perfect condition, making it very valuable, especially with its deep water facilities. On 6 September, the 4th Canadian Armoured Division crossed the border with Belgium and took areas around Ypres and Passchendaele.

The Ghent Canal

Between 9 and 11 September, the 1st Polish Armoured Division attempted to capture control of the Ghent canal, resulting in heavy losses for the Poles, after running into fierce resistance over difficult terrain. A narrow river crossing was opened and extended slowly due to heavy enemy resistance.

The Ardennes
The First United States Army, under General Courtney Hodges, captured areas south of Brussels in early September 1944. The U.S. units were spread very thinly from south of Liège, through the Ardennes and into Luxembourg, leaving their defensive line lightly reinforced. Between September and 16 December, the Ardennes Forest was the "quiet sector"—the Americans used this area to rest tired units.

Adolf Hitler launched Germany's last offensive of the Western Front on 16 December, known as the Battle of the Bulge. He intended to push through the Ardennes Forest with the 6th Panzer Division advancing and capturing the coastal town of Antwerp. The Fifth Panzer Army, under German general Hasso von Manteuffel, was to attack the U.S. forces in the region, and the 7th German Army was to attack to the south to cut off supplies and create a buffer zone.

On the morning of the 16 December, a two-hour German artillery bombardment startled the Allies. When the German forces attacked, it was foggy, and the Allies could not use their air superiority to resupply ground units. On 18 December, after advancing  in two days, the Germans reached a point of stalemate. By the 22nd, the weather had cleared, allowing the Allies to be resupplied. Vicious fighting followed, ending in mid-January when the German tank units began to run out of fuel.

The battle ended with the Germans in full retreat. 600,000 U.S. troops were involved in the battle, making it the largest ground battle the U.S. Army has ever fought. 81,000 U.S. troops were killed or wounded. Estimates of German casualties range from 67,675 to 125,000 killed, wounded and missing.

References

External links
 Entry into Brussels, newsreel on British Pathé YouTube Channel
 Antwerp (1944), newsreel on British Pathé YouTube Channel

Belgium in World War II
L
1944 in Belgium
1945 in Belgium